Gaali Medalu is a 1962 Indian Telugu-language drama film, produced and directed by B. R. Panthulu. It stars N. T. Rama Rao and Devika, with music composed by T. G. Lingappa. The film was simultaneously made in Kannada as Gaali Gopura by the same banner and director. Both the versions were successful at the box-office.

Plot 
A rich man Ranganatham (V. Nagayya) suffers from T.B., before leaving for treatment, he entrusts his son Krishna and the property to his close friend Paanakaalu (S. V. Ranga Rao). But the greedy Paanakaalu escapes the village, purchases land in the town, and informs everyone he is going to Rangoon. Meanwhile, Ranganatham recovers and knows that Paanakaalu is left to Rangoon, so, he too moves in search of his son. After that, Paanakaalu is blessed with a son Mohan, he engages Krishna in the fields and educates Mohan. Years roll by, Paanakaalu becomes rich, Krishna (N. T. Rama Rao) is good natured and loves Lakshmi (Devika), daughter of Paanakaalu's distant relative Naganna. Paanakaalu takes money as dowry in advance from Naganna by fixing Lakshmi's alliance with Mohan (Jaggayya). In the city, Mohan becomes a spoiled brat and also makes cheating with the help of his friend Platform (Ramana Reddy). He traps a beautiful girl Nirmala (Jayanthi), the daughter of a Zamindar (Rajanala) by focusing on himself as a millionaire. Parallelly, Paanakaalu learns about the love affair of Krishna & Lakshmi, he accuses Krishna and throws him out by revealing his birth secret. At the same time, Paanakaalu knows Mohan loves the Zamindar's daughter of their village, so, he makes a ploy, and sends Lakshmi in search of Krishna, Naganna also follows her and they reach the city. A tea vendor Kanakam (Surabhi Balasaraswathi) gives shelter to Lakshmi. On the other side, Ranganatham returns from Rangoon as a millionaire and is still in search of Paanakaalu. Fortunately, Krishna joins as a servant at him. Simultaneously, Mohan makes his marriage arrangements with Nirmala for which Paanakaalu sell his property. During the time of marriage, Nagamma visits and reveals the truth. The Zamindar becomes furious, but for his daughter's sack, he allows Mohan to stay with them and throws away Paanakaalu when he loses a limb and becomes a beggar. Eventually, Platform gets acquainted with Kanakam and they fell in love. As a coincidence, Ranganatham & the Zamindar are familiar with each other, once he narrates his story, Mohan listens to it and makes a plan. Meantime, Krishna finds his mother, and both of them go for Paanakaalu, by that time, Mohan takes and leaves him far away from the city where Lakshmi & Platform protect him. Now Mohan showcases himself as Ranganathan's son. Overexcited, Ranganatham brings Mohan home where Krishna is shocked to see him and warns Mohan to leave the house until morning. But that night, crooked Mohan tries to kill Ranganatham, and Krishna saves him. At last, Paanakaalu arrives, and reveals Krishna as his real son, at that moment, Mohan also realises his mistake. Finally, the movie ends on a happy note with the marriage of Krishna & Lakshmi.

Cast 
N. T. Rama Rao as Krishna
Devika as Lakshmi
S. V. Ranga Rao as Paanakaalu
Jaggayya as Mohan
Rajanala as Zamindar
V. Nagayya as Ranganatham
Ramana Reddy as Platform
Jayanthi as Nirmala / Nimmy
M. V. Rajamma as Santhamma
Surabhi Balasaraswathi as Kanakam
 B. Rama Devi Venku (Rajanala's Wife)
 B. Viswanatham as Naganna

Soundtrack 
Music composed by T. G. Lingappa.

References

External links 
 

Indian drama films
Indian black-and-white films
Films directed by B. R. Panthulu
Films scored by T. G. Lingappa
1960s Telugu-language films